Freelon is a surname. Notable people with the surname include:

Allan Randall Freelon (1895–1960), American artist
Nnenna Freelon (born 1954), American jazz singer
Philip Freelon (1953–2019), American architect
Pierce Freelon, American academic
Solomon Freelon (born 1951), American football player